John Henry "Tripp" Isenhour III (born April 6, 1968) is an American professional golfer.

Isenhour was born in Salisbury, North Carolina. He played college golf at Georgia Tech and turned professional in 1990.

Isenhour played on the Nationwide Tour in 1996, 1998, 1999, 2000, 2003, 2005, 2006 and 2008. He was a member of the PGA Tour in 2001, 2002, 2004, 2005 and 2007. He has not played on either tour since 2008.

Hawk incident
On December 12, 2007, while being filmed for an educational video, Isenhour killed a red-shouldered hawk by hitting it with a golf ball. According to court documents, Isenhour was irritated by the noises the hawk was making. He hit golf balls at the bird until one struck it in the head. On August 29, 2008, he accepted a plea agreement "to serve one year of probation, donate $1,500 to the Busch Wildlife Sanctuary in Jupiter, Fla., and pay a $500 fine. The former PGA Tour player was also required to undergo 40 hours of community service and attend a four-hour anger-management class."

Professional wins (6)

Nationwide Tour wins (4)

Other wins (2)
1998 Trinidad Open, Kansas Open

Results in major championships

CUT = missed the half-way cut
Note: Isenhour only played in the U.S. Open.

See also
2000 Buy.com Tour graduates
2003 Nationwide Tour graduates
2006 Nationwide Tour graduates
List of golfers with most Web.com Tour wins

References

External links

American male golfers
Georgia Tech Yellow Jackets men's golfers
PGA Tour golfers
Korn Ferry Tour graduates
Golfers from North Carolina
Golfers from Orlando, Florida
People from Salisbury, North Carolina
1968 births
Living people